Vlad Batrîncea (born 31 March 1981) is a Moldovan politician who currently serves as Deputy Speaker of the Parliament of the Republic of Moldova (since November 2019). He has been the executive secretary of the Party of Socialists of the Republic of Moldova (PSRM) since 2019 and the de facto leader of the party since January 2022.

Career

Education
Batrincea was registered at the Faculty of History and philosophy of Moldovan State University in 1999. After the first year of studies he was expelled due to overdue and absent hours. He followed his studies at Slavonic University in Moldova, where he took his master's degree in international law. Batrîncea is also a chess player.

Political career

He was a Member of the Party of Communists of the Republic of Moldova until 2011. In that year he was part of Igor Dodon's group that left the communists, setting up the Party of Socialists of the Republic of Moldova. In PSRM, Batrîncea has been on a rapid rise, becoming a Member of the Republican Committee of the PSRM, a Member of the party's political Executive Committee, and since June 2013 – executive secretary of the party.

In the parliamentary elections of 30 November 2014 in the Republic of Moldova, he ran for the post of deputy from PSRM, being the 7th in the list, and therefore won the mandate of deputy in the Parliament of the Republic of Moldova. Since March 9, 2019, he has been a member, from the PSRM fraction, in the Parliament of the Republic of Moldova. On 9 June 2019, Vlad Batrincea was elected President of the PSRM fraction in the Parliament.

Political position 

As a member of the PSRM, Batrîncea is known for his strong pro-Russian stance, supporting Moldova's accession to the Eurasian Economic Union (Moldova currently has observer status in this organization). He is also known for his populist rhetoric.

Controversies
On 10 December 2015, in the applause of his fellow party colleagues, Batrîncea destroyed the map of Greater Romania, a gesture in protest against an order of the Ministry of Education through which the map was to be distributed, by donation from an association, as teaching material, in the education system for use in history lessons. The next day, Liberal Deputy Alina Zotea addressed a request to Romanian President Klaus Iohannis, asking him to declare Batrîncea persona non grata and to ban him from entering Romania. Romanian Ambassador to Moldova Marius Lazurca did not consider Batrîncea's move an offense against his country. “A Moldovan politician wanted to demonstratively destroy an object with teaching use. Some of the deputies from Mr Batrîncea's party found it appropriate to applaud this gesture. Along with Mr Batrîncea was the Former Prime-Minister Zinaida Greceanîi, who did not applaude, which I find to be a proof of wisdom and moderation", said the ambassador. In 2018 Batrîncea stated that he did not regret his action, saying it was not an anti-Romanian gesture, but against a non-existing country. In 2021, the unionist deputy Vasile Șoimaru (PAS) gave Batrîncea another map of Greater Romania, saying "I found a destroyed map six years ago. If you allow me, I will return it to the one who may be sorry he did so then. Even if he is not sorry, I give him this map and ask him not to do it again if he wants to remain a colleague with us".

Awards 
 Order of Work Glory (2018)

References

Living people
1981 births
Politicians from Chișinău
Party of Communists of the Republic of Moldova politicians
Party of Socialists of the Republic of Moldova politicians
Members of the parliament of Moldova
Moldovan jurists
Eastern Orthodox Christians from Moldova